Fraud is a 2016 conceptual documentary film directed by Dean Fleischer Camp. The film is made up of re-edited homevideos uploaded to YouTube. It tells the fictional story of an average white American family of four obsessively shopping at Big Box stores until their increasing mountain of debt leads them to go to extremes in order to wipe the slate clean and keep the money flowing.

David Gordon Green, Jody Hill, and Danny McBride serve as executive producers.

Origins
In the late 2000s, around the time he was directing the short film, Marcel the Shell with Shoes On, Camp was digging through clips on the user-generated content platform YouTube when he stumbled across over 100 hours of home video footage documenting the life of an unknown American family and uploaded to the internet between 2008 and 2015. He was initially hesitant to turn it into a documentary because of the effort and time required to cut the footage down to feature length.

Release
The film world-premiered at Hot Docs in May 2016 where the premiere was controversial, with arguments breaking out during post-screening Q&As between the director and members of the audience as well as amongst the audience members themselves. The film has been selected to screen at BAMcinemaFest at the Brooklyn Academy of Music in New York and the Sheffield International Documentary Festival (SIDF) in the United Kingdom.

References

External links

Fraud  Official Website

American documentary films
American avant-garde and experimental films
Collage film
Films shot from the first-person perspective
2010s avant-garde and experimental films
2010s American films
Films directed by Dean Fleischer Camp